Leucopogon concinnus is a species of flowering plant in the heath family Ericaceae and is endemic to the south-west of Western Australia. It is a low-lying shrub with many branches. The flowers are arranged singly or in pairs in leaf axils on a short peduncle.

The species was first formally described in 1868 by George Bentham in Flora Australiensis. The specific epithet (concinnus) means "neat" or "pretty".

Leucopogon concinnus occurs in the Avon Wheatbelt, Esperance Plains, Jarrah Forest and Mallee bioregions of south-western Western Australia and is listed as "not threatened" by the Government of Western Australia Department of Biodiversity, Conservation and Attractions.

References

concinnus
Ericales of Australia
Flora of Western Australia
Plants described in 1868
Taxa named by George Bentham